Abda may refer to:

Given name
 Abda (biblical figure), two biblical figures
 Abda of Edessa (dates unknown), Bishop of Edessa and saint of the Syriac Orthodox Church
 Abda of Dair-Koni (c. 450–?), also known as Rabban Mar Abda, abbot and saint of the Church of the East
 Abda of Hira (died 680), monk and saint of the Assyrian Church of the East
 Abdas of Susa (died 420), Persian bishop, also spelled Abda
 Abda, one of the two Christian martyrs, Abda and Sabas
 Abda, one of two Christian martyr bishops, Abda and Abdjesus
 Abda, or Abd-al-Masih (martyr), Christian saint and martyr
 Urraca Sanchez, daughter of King Sancho II of Pamplona who adopted the Arabic name Abda after being given to Almanzor

Other uses
 Abda, Hungary, a village
 Abda (Morocco), an Arabophone tribal confederacy of Morocco
 American-British-Dutch-Australian Command (ABDA Command), a short-lived World War II supreme command of Allied forces in Southeast Asia

See also
 Ben Abda, a surname